Meurer is a surname. Notable people with the surname include:

Hugo Meurer (1869–1960), German vice-admiral of the Kaiserliche Marine
Manfred Meurer (1919–1944), German Luftwaffe pilot
Markus Meurer (born 1959), German outsider artist
Nelson Meurer (1942–2020), Brazilian politician
Willi Meurer (1915–1981), German cyclist